Sacramento Gold is an American soccer team based in Sacramento, California, United States. Founded in 2009, the team plays in National Premier Soccer League (NPSL), a national amateur league at the fourth tier of the American Soccer Pyramid, in the West Region, Golden Gate Conference.

The team plays its home games in the stadium at Capital Christian School, where they have played since 2017. Previously, they played in the stadium at River City High School. The team's colors are burgundy, navy blue, and white.

History
The Gold began play in the NPSL during the 2010 season, finishing first within the Northwest Division in regular season before eventually winning the playoff title. After beating FC Sonic Lehigh Valley in the semifinal, the team went on to defeat Chattanooga FC, 3–1, in the National Championship.

Since its founding, Sacramento has qualified for two U.S. Open Cup tournaments in 2013 and 2016 respectively. In its first ever tournament game, the Gold held a two-goal lead over United Soccer League side Portland Timbers 2 before eventually losing, 3–2. Three years later a hat-trick by Manolo Piña earned Sacramento its first U.S. Open Cup victory when it defeated the Premier Developmental League's Burlingame Dragons FC, 3–0, on May 11, 2016. The team fell to local qualifier La Máquina FC in the next round.

Year-by-year

Honors
 National Premier Soccer League
 Winners: 2010
Western Regional Champs (Playoff NPSL):
 Winners: 2010, 2014 
 Northwest Division (NPSL):
 Winners: 2010
 Golden Gate Conference (NPSL):
 Winners: 2014

Head coaches
  Ruben Mora Jr. (2011, 2012, 2014, 2015–present)
  Rick Caldwell (2010, 2013)

Players
''See :Category:Sacramento Gold FC players

Stadiums 
 Stadium at River City High School; West Sacramento, California (2010–2016)
 Stadium at Capital Christian School; Sacramento, California (2017–present)

References

External links

National Premier Soccer League teams
Gold
2009 establishments in California
Soccer clubs in California
Association football clubs established in 2009